Kai Burger (born 9 November 1992) is a German footballer who plays as a forward for Fortuna Köln.

References

External links
 

1992 births
Living people
Footballers from Cologne
German footballers
Association football forwards
SC Fortuna Köln players
3. Liga players